The Batavia Muckdogs are a collegiate summer baseball team in the Perfect Game Collegiate Baseball League (PGCBL). They are located in Batavia, a city in Genesee County, New York, United States. Their home field is Dwyer Stadium in the city of Batavia.

Off and on from 1939 to 2020, they were members of Minor League Baseball's New York–Penn League (NYPL). With Major League Baseball's reorganization of the minor leagues after the 2020 season, Batavia was not selected to continue in affiliated baseball. They later joined PGCBL for the 2021 season.

History

Prior to the current Batavia franchise, professional baseball in the city dates back to 1897 when Batavia played in the New York State League. The Batavia Giants, sometimes referred to as the Reds because of their crimsons uniforms, were the first classified team in the city making their debut - after some rainouts - on May 14, 1897 against the Auburn franchise at a stadium built on Swan Street; future major leaguer Jack Burns batted third and played shortstop. After a rough start to the season, where the team lost their first 9 games, the team released eight players and fired manager Martin Earley. J.J. Benner took over the club as team captain and acting manager, however play did not improve and he was replaced by former major leaguer Joe Hornung who was named player-manager on May 24, he made his debut in the lineup on June 14 at 40 years old, going hitless. After 20 games the team sat at 4–16 and had money troubles where local fans would not pay the 10 cent admission, Hornung left the team on July 9. It was announced on July 24th that the team would move to Geneva, by July 25 the team had left Batavia and become the Geneva Alhambras. That season the Class-C New York State League also consisted of teams in Canandaigua, Cortland, Lyons, Palmyra, and Auburn.

As was popular across the country, Batavia hosted many semi-pro leagues prior too, and after, the Giants left town.  This included the Western New York League along with teams in nearby Le Roy, Perry and Warsaw. The Batavia Bees were the popular semi-pro team prior to professional baseball coming back to Batavia in 1939, and they continued play even after the Clippers arrived.

The history of the New York–Penn League originated in Batavia as the league, then known as the Pennsylvania–Ontario–New York League (PONY League), was formed in a local hotel that has since been demolished. Original league cities included Batavia, Bradford, Hamilton, Jamestown, Niagara Falls, and Olean.

The Muckdogs were founded in 1939 as the Batavia Clippers, however the team was not in operation during the 1954–56 and 1960 seasons after dropping out of the league for financial reasons.  During the 1957 through 1959 seasons the team was known as the Batavia Indians, upon their final return to the league in 1961 the team was known as the Batavia Pirates until changing their name to the Batavia Trojans in 1966 until 1987.

From 1988 through the 1997 season the team brought back the historic Batavia Clippers name before changing to the Muckdogs in 1998 based on a fan poll that chose the nickname and logo. The "Muckdogs" name was inspired by Genesee County's mucklands. Batavia celebrated their 80th anniversary during the 2019 seasons as the only founding member of the league still in existence.

The Muckdogs franchise was surrendered to the league prior to the 2018 season. The team was then operated as a ward of the league.

After the cancelled 2020 minor league season, Major League Baseball took direct control of Minor League Baseball and discontinued short-season play. The Muckdogs were not among the teams invited to remain in affiliated baseball. The city received offers from collegiate summer baseball and semi-professional leagues for 2021. After being purchased by CAN-USA Sports, the Muckdogs joined Perfect Game Collegiate Baseball League, a collegiate summer league, for 2021.

Logo and mascot
The Muckdogs logo adopted in 1998 is a dog on a crushed fence in the shape of an "M" surrounded by muck with baseballs on either side. The team also has an alternate logo of a B with a dog.

The Muckdogs currently have one mascot, Dewey, however had three mascots who would make appearances throughout the season at Dwyer Stadium in recent years. The team's original mascot Maxwell T. Chomper, Homer and Slider.

Season-by-season record

Affiliation
As the Muckdogs, Batavia was affiliated with the Philadelphia Phillies from 1998, having been already affiliated with the Phillies since 1988, through the 2006 season.  Beginning with the 2007 season, the Phillies chose to move their Short-Season A affiliate closer to Philadelphia with the Williamsport Crosscutters.  Meanwhile, the Muckdogs signed with the St. Louis Cardinals. Prior to the Cardinals and Phillies affiliation Batavia was also affiliated with the Pittsburgh Pirates (1952–53; 1961–65), Detroit Tigers (1968–71), New York Mets (1972–74), and Cleveland Indians (1942–51; 1957–59; 1976–86). The team also fielded a co-op team in 1966 featuring players from 12 different organizations, most notably Cito Gaston of the Atlanta Braves. In 1975, the team fielded another co-op team with players from 8 organizations including Don McCormack from the Philadelphia Phillies. 1987 was the final co-op team in Batavia.

After the 2012 season, the St. Louis Cardinals announced they would move their affiliation to the State College Spikes, who they had been affiliated with before coming to Batavia. On September 28, 2012, the Muckdogs announced they had signed a two-year player development contract with the Miami Marlins who were affiliated with the Jamestown Jammers from 2002 to 2011. Jamestown signed an affiliation agreement with the Pittsburgh Pirates who had left State College.

Operations/ownership
From 2008 to 2017 the Rochester Red Wings Triple-A team of the International League was responsible for operating the club. The team had previously been operated by the Genesee County Baseball Club who remained majority owner though the Red Wings gained a share of ownership with each season they operated the franchise with a cap of 50%.

The team has been up for sale since 2010 due to financial losses. In 2016, a sale to an ownership group that intended to relocate the franchise to Waldorf, Maryland, beginning in the 2017 season collapsed when the new owners were unable to secure permission from the Baltimore Orioles and Washington Nationals, as well as the Eastern League and Carolina League. The Orioles' Class-AA affiliate, the Eastern League's Bowie Baysox, are located in nearby Bowie, Maryland; the Nationals' Class-A affiliate, the Potomac Nationals, are based in nearby Woodbridge, Virginia. A Muckdogs move to Maryland would have impacted those teams' territorial rights.

Surrender of franchise
The Muckdogs ownership group surrendered their franchise to the NYPL on December 19, 2017, after the NYPL declined the Red Wings offer to continue to operate the ball club and the remaining owners could not meet the financial requirements to keep the team solvent. Under the terms of the surrender, if the NYPL sells the franchise, the Red Wings and Genesee County Baseball Club each will receive 45% of the proceeds, with the league keeping a 10% fee for themselves. GCBC will retain the rights to the Batavia Muckdogs name, should the league opt to relocate the franchise to a city other than Batavia. The NYPL did not guarantee the franchise will play in 2018 if a buyer could not be found. GCBC spoke of the possibility of bringing collegiate summer baseball to Batavia in the event the NYPL left.

In January 2018, the New York–Penn League agreed to keep the Muckdogs in Batavia for the 2018 season after agreeing with the City of Batavia on a lease for Dwyer Field. In 2019, the Muckdogs signed a two-year renewal of its affiliation with the Marlins, which the city insisted upon as a condition of keeping the team in Batavia; any new ownership group would still be free to move the team.

As part of the reorganization of minor league baseball, the Muckdogs minor league squad was contracted along with most of the rest of the New York-Penn League prior to the 2021 season. GCBC, in keeping with their 2017 statements, transferred the Muckdogs intellectual property to a new expansion team in the PGCBL. The Muckdogs were one of two NYPL brands to make the transfer at that time (the Auburn Doubledays being the other); the Jamestown Jammers had previously made a similar transition in 2015.

Record
Through the 2017 season, Batavia has played 75 seasons of professional baseball in its current location amassing 3,197 wins and 3,532 losses (.475).

The team's 3,000th win came in form of a 5–3 decision on June 23, 2012, against the Jamestown Jammers at Russell Diethrick Park in Jamestown, New York. Jamestown was the only other city of the league's original six remaining in the circuit, although it does not host the same franchise. Relief pitcher Jose Almarante earned the win.

Managerial history
Jack Tighe holds the All-Time record for wins in Batavia with a record of 298 wins and 239 losses in four seasons.
Dann Bilardello is tied for the modern era regular (short-season) record with 126 wins and 99 losses in three seasons, Ángel Espada tied the record in the last game of the 2016 season after four seasons, however Bilardello has one playoff victory as well giving him 127 wins overall.  Mike Jacobs was named the Muckdogs manager for the 2017/2018 seasons, Tom Lawless managed the club in 2019.

Gene Baker was the first African-American manager in affiliated baseball during the 1961 season with the Batavia Pirates.  Baker also is credited as being the first African-American manager in Major League History when he filled in after ejections, however, Frank Robinson was the first ever hired full time.

All-time managerial records

Most MLB players on a short-season team
The 1986 Batavia Trojans featured a short-season team record of eight future Major Leaguers on the roster — Jim Bruske, Tommy Hinzo, Tom Lampkin, Troy Neel, Bruce Egloff, Jeff Shaw, Joe Skalski, and Kevin Wickander—while affiliated with the Cleveland Indians.  The record has since been broken with 11 by Batavia in 2007.

No-hitters
Batavia has been no-hit 15 times and thrown 5 no-hitters, however they are one of only two teams in league history who went on to win a game they had been no hit in when they defeated Newark 2–0 on August 3, 1973, for a record of 5–13 overall. Batavia was also part of the first ever league dual no-hitter where on August 25, 1952 Jim Mitchell of the Batavia Clippers and Frank Etchberger of the Bradford Phillies each no-hit the others team in opposite ends of a double header. The Clippers no-hit effort was not without controversy as it was a change by the official scorer that gave Mitchell his no-no. The Bradford paper reported the ball hit the glove of an outfielder and rolled to the wall where Bradford's Tommy Keane was originally given a double, it was then changed to an error after the game.  On June 24, 2015 three Batavia pitchers (Gabriel Castellanos, Brett Lilek, Steven Farnworth) combined for the teams first perfect game in history against the Mahoning Valley Scrappers.

List of no-hitters

* Denotes Perfect Game

Playoff history
In the team's storied history they have made a total of 19 playoff appearances.

Overview
Batavia has won four league championships including 2008 as the Muckdogs, 1963 season as the Batavia Pirates and the 1945 and 1946 seasons as the Batavia Clippers. Batavia has won five division championships since the league adapted divisional play starting in the 1977 season, these titles include the Pinckney Division in 1995, 2008, and 2010, the Stedler in 1998, and the Western Division in 1977.  The team also made playoff appearances as the Wild Card in 1999 and 2000 where they lost in the semi-finals, as well as 1997 when they advanced to the league championship where they were defeated by the Pittsfield Mets.

Playoff appearances

 Denotes regular season league finish before divisional play.

1945 league and playoff champions
During the PONY League seasons from 1939 to 1956, there was a league champion and playoff champion format; the 1945 season saw Batavia finish with a record of 84 wins and 40 losses to clinch the league championship by nine games over the Jamestown Falcons. The Clippers defeated the Bradford Blue Wings three games to one in the first round of the playoffs before defeating the Lockport White Sox four games to three in the playoff championship. Batavia had a league best 1.40 ERA during the season.

1946 league and playoff champions
The 1946 season saw Batavia and Jamestown finish tied with a record of 84 wins and 41 losses to claim a share of the league championship.  Jamestown defeated Batavia in a one-game playoff by a score of 6–2. Batavia then defeated the Olean Oilers in the playoffs four games to three before defeating Jamestown four games to two in the championship. Batavia's Dick Kokos lead the league during the 1946 season in runs with 118, hits with 166, RBIs with 114, and tied for home runs with 21.

1963 playoff champions
The 1963 Batavia Pirates were an unlikely championship team that entered the playoffs with 42 wins and 67 losses during the regular season. Facing the Jamestown Tigers in the best of three series the Pirates opened with a home loss by the score of 4–3 before heading to Jamestown to defeat the Tigers by a score of 2–1. During game two pitchers Bob Lee and Bob Baird shut down Jamestown as Fred Michalski hit a home run early and Norm Housley drove in a run in the seventh that gave Batavia all the runs the pitching due would need, the Tigers scored their loan run in the bottom of the seventh. In the series finale the Pirates won handily by the score of 7–3 before a home crowd of 1,305 at MacArthur Stadium. Byron Brown, who led the league with 32 home runs in the regular season, hit a two-run home run in the first inning and then drove in two more with a single in the fourth. Lefty Ron Fiorella was the winning pitcher for the Pirates while Jim Hassett also hit a home run during the deciding game. Leading the Pirates for the playoffs was José Martínez with 8 hits as Fiorella picked up two wins.

1977 West Division Champions
In 1957 the PONY League adapted the name the New–York Pennsylvania League and continued to do a league champion and playoff champion until 1974 when it was changed to a first half and second half champion until the 1976 season. During the 1977 season the league did a first half and second half champion within two divisions instead of a league format, Batavia won the Western Division in both halves. The following season, 1978, the league changed to solely one season division format.

During the 1977 League Finals Oneonta defeated the Batavia squad 2-0 to clinch the League Championship.  In Game One, played in Batavia, the Yankees defeated the Trojans 5-2 behind the pitching of southpaw Chris Welsh, who struck out 11 batters.  Future Major League Baseball star Willie McGee played centerfield for the Yankees, Sal Rende and Jerry Dybzinski homered for the Trojans.

In Game two of the Championship Series the Yankees held off the Trojans by the score of 5-4, though the Trojans were down 5-0.

1995 Pinckney Division Champions
Batavia won the Stedler Division with a record of 41 wins and 34 losses under manager Al LeBoeuf before losing in the semifinals to eventual champion the Watertown Indians. Team leaders included Walt Dawkins with a .315 average; Steve Carver with 41 RBIs, 7 home runs and 13 doubles which tied with Jon Cornelius; future major leaguer Marlon Anderson with 92 hits and 52 runs; Gary Yeager with 9 wins; Brian Ford with a 1.18 ERA and 10 saves. The team also featured future major leaguer Anthony Shumaker.

1997 Wild Card
Batavia clinched the Wild Card playoff spot in 1997 finishing with a record of 47 wins and 27 losses under manager Greg Legg. The Clippers defeated the Erie SeaWolves in the semifinals before falling to the Pittsfield Mets in the league championship. Team leaders included Gary Burham with a .325 average, 22 doubles, and 94 hits; future major leaguer Andy Dominique with 14 home runs; Jason Johnson with 20 stolen bases and 5 triples; Rusty McNamara with 54 RBIs; Derek Adair with 7 wins; Clay Eason with a 0.92 ERA; and Brett Black with 15 saves.  The team also included future major leaguers Randy Wolf, Thomas Jacquez, and Johnny Estrada.

1998 Stedler Division Champions
Batavia finished with a record of 43 wins and 33 losses winning the Stedler Division under manager Frank Klebe before losing to the Auburn Doubledays in the semifinals. 1998 was one of the only times in league history there would be co-champions as the weather made fields unplayable, Auburn and the Oneonta Yankees were named co-champions. Team leaders for Batavia included future major leaguer Jason Michaels with 11 home runs; Shayne Carnes with a .329 average and 78 hits; Carlos Duncan with 23 doubles and 55 runs; Nick Punto with 19 stolen bases; Geoff Geary with 9 wins and 1.60 ERA; Cary Hiles with 10 saves. The team also featured future major leaguer Carlos Silva.

1999 Wild Card
Batavia finished with a record of 42 wins and 34 losses one game behind division champion the Mahoning Valley Scrappers under manager Greg Legg. Batavia lost to the Scrappers in the semi-finals. Team leaders include future major league outfielder Marlon Byrd with 13 home runs, 50 RBIs, 72 hits; Shomari Beverly with 13 doubles; Tom Batson with a .298 average; Brad Pautz with 8 wins; Ryan Brookman with a 0.46 ERA; Justin Fry with 6 saves.  The team also featured major leaguers Frank Brooks, Ryan Madson, and Jorge Padilla.

2000 Wild Card
Batavia finished with a record of 39 wins and 37 losses during the 2000 season under manager Frank Klebe earning a playoff spot as a Wild Card eventually losing to the Mahoning Valley Scrappers in the semi-finals for the second year in a row.  Future major leaguer Travis Chapman lead the team in hitting with a .316 average, other team leaders included Dario Delgado with 40 RBIs and 7 home runs; Scott Youngbauer with 16 doubles; Jason Barnette with 67 hits; Anthony Hensley with 43 stolen bases; Dan Adams with a 2.17 ERA; Trevor Bullock with six wins.  The team featured future Phillies All-Star Chase Utley as well as Miguel Asencio and Eude Brito.

2008 NY–Penn League Champions
Under manager Mark DeJohn during the 2008 season the team finished the regular season with 46 wins and 28 losses to clinch the Pinckney Division title. Batavia swept the Florida Marlins affiliate the Jamestown Jammers to claim the 2008 NY–Penn League championship on September 14, 2008 by a score of 9–3, after defeating the Boston Red Sox affiliate the Lowell Spinners two games to one in the semi-finals. Team leaders included Jermaine Curtis and Colt Sedbrook with a .305 average; Chris Swauger with 7 home runs; Shane Peterson with 20 doubles and 67 hits; Jose Garcia with 48 runs; Ramón Delgado with 6 wins; Thomas Eager with a 1.76 ERA; and Adam Reifer 22 saves

2010 Pinckney Division Champions
The Muckdogs won the 2010 Pinckney Division Championship under manager Dann Bilardello with a record of 45 wins and 29 losses, clinching against the Jamestown Jammers on September 1 at Russell Diethrick Park in Jamestown, New York. Batavia lost in the semi-finals to eventual league champion the Tri-City ValleyCats two games to one. Team leaders include Rainel Rosario with a .321 average; Jonathan Rodriguez with 12 home runs; Victor Sanchez with 19 doubles; Nick Longmire with 76 hits, 7 triples, and 53 runs; Andrew Moss with 8 wins; Jose Rada with a 1.12 ERA and ten saves.

2019 Pinckney Division Champions
The Muckdogs won the 2019 Pinckney Division Championship under manager Tom Lawless with a record of 41 wins and 31 losses, clinching against the Auburn Doubledays on the last day of the season - September 2 at Falcon Park in Auburn, New York. Batavia defeated the Lowell Spinners in game one of their playoff series before dropping two games in Lowell by the scores of 1–2 and 3–4;  the Brooklyn Cyclones defeated Lowell in the finals.  Team leaders included Nic Ready with 10 home runs, 47 RBI's, and tied a league record of 30 doubles;  JD Orr with a .352 batting average and 29 stolen bases; Julio Frias lead the pitching staff with 5 victors - tied with Jackson Rose- while striking out 73 over 70 innings;  Evan Brabrand had a 1.29 ERA in the closer role compiling 13 saves;  Edgar Martinez lead the team with 72 innings pitched.

Attendance

Largest crowd

The largest crowd to attend a professional game in Batavia is over 4,000 during the inaugural 1939 season. In more recent years, the two largest crowds happened on July 27, 2019 with 2,779 fans packing the stadium thanks to a promotion from local company Tompkins Insurance that bought anyone who wanted to attend a ticket. On July 29, 2011, 2,445 fans attended a game versus the Staten Island Yankees to see local Rochester native Cito Culver, who scored two runs for the Yankees and also batted another run in.

Year by Year
As teams move to larger markets, and western New York area residency dwindling, the Muckdogs find themselves ranking last in attendance, though in 2008 a new policy was put forth by the Red Wings management to only report through the gate fans and not add on like several teams do to pad attendance records. Attendance substantially rebounded in 2019 as fans rallied behind the team in a last-ditch effort to save it.

Roster

Notable Major League alumni

 Andy Allanson (1983)
 Marlon Anderson (1995)
 Andy Ashby (1988) 2 x MLB All-Star
 Gene Baker (1961) MLB All-Star
 Gary Bennett (1993)
 Steve Blass (1961) MLB All-Star
 Marlon Byrd (1999) MLB All-Star
 Matt Carpenter (2009) 3 x MLB All-Star
 Carlos Carrasco (2005)
 Doc Ellis (1964) MLB All-Star
 Johnny Estrada (1997) MLB All-Star
 Woodie Fryman (1965) 2 x MLB All-Star
 Gene Garber (1965)
 Cito Gaston (1966) MLB All-Star; Manager 1992-1993 World Series Champion - Toronto Blue Jays
 Kelly Gruber (1980 2 x MLB All-Star
 Joe Kelly (2009)
 J.A. Happ (2004) MLB All-Star
 Ryan Howard (2001) 3 x  MLB All Star; 2005 NL Rookie of the Year; 2006 NL Most Valuable Player
 Bob Lee (1963) MLB All-Star
 Lance Lynn (2009) MLB All-Star
 Ryan Madson (1999)
 Lou Marson (2005)
 Nick Punto (1998)
 Manny Sanguillén (1965) 3 x MLB All-Star
 Jeff Shaw (1986) 2 x MLB All-Star
 Ryan Sherriff (2011)
 Kevin Siegrist (2009)
 Chase Utley (2000) 6 x MLB All-Star
 Randy Wolf (1997) MLB All-Star
 Mike Williams (1990) 2 x MLB All-Star
 Trevor Williams (2013)
 Ned Yost (1974) Manager 2015 World Series Champion - Kansas City Royals
 Brad Ziegler (2003)

Alumni in other sports
Five-time National Hockey League (NHL) all-star Murray Oliver played for Batavia during the 1958 season.

National Football League (NFL) tailback Ricky Williams played thirteen games for the team during the 1998 season before returning to Texas to prepare for the upcoming NCAA football season as a strong candidate for the Heisman Award, which he ultimately won.

Local ties
Fourteen Genesee County Baseball Players have suited up professionally for their local Batavia team.

 1939 – OF Gordon "Bus" Merrill from Elba, P Frank "Pike" Trigilio from Oakfield, and 1B James "Jim" Carragher from Le Roy
 1940 – P William "Bill" Kell from Darien and OF Laverne "Pete" Petherbridge from Byron
 1943–1944 – P Theodore "Ted" Platek from Pavilion
 1946–1947 – P John "Johnny" Freeman from S. Byron
 1948 – INF Jerry Maley from Batavia
 1950 – C Robert "Bob" Radley from Batavia
 1951 – P Ray "Jamo" Jamalkowski from Batavia
 1952 and 1957 – P Richard "Dick" Raymond from Batavia
 1957 – P Frank Dudley from Batavia
 1958 – P Larry Richenburg from Elba
 1989 – OF Mickey Hyde from E. Bethany

Local players who have suited up for the Perfect Game Collegiate Baseball League franchise.
 2021 – P Colin Noeth from Byron 
 2021–Pres. – INF Jerry Reinhart from Batavia
 2021–Pres. – P Tyler Prospero from Batavia
 2022–Pres. – C Vinny Grazioplene from Batavia
 2022–Pres. – OF Gavin Schrader from Batavia
 2022–Pres. – P Alex Hale from Batavia

References

External links
 
 Statistics from Baseball-Reference
Batavia Muckdogs - Perfect Game Collegiate Baseball League - team roster

Baseball teams established in 1939
New York–Penn League teams
Professional baseball teams in New York (state)
Cleveland Guardians minor league affiliates
Detroit Tigers minor league affiliates
Miami Marlins minor league affiliates
New York Mets minor league affiliates
Philadelphia Phillies minor league affiliates
Pittsburgh Pirates minor league affiliates
St. Louis Cardinals minor league affiliates
1939 establishments in New York (state)
Amateur baseball teams in New York (state)
Batavia, New York